The Owls Head Light is an active aid to navigation located at the entrance of Rockland Harbor on western Penobscot Bay in the town of Owls Head, Knox County, Maine. The lighthouse is owned by the U.S. Coast Guard and licensed to the American Lighthouse Foundation. It is the centerpiece of  Owls Head State Park and was added to the National Register of Historic Places as Owls Head Light Station in 1978.

History
The town of Owls Head is located south of Rockland, and includes an eponymous peninsula that projects northeast into Penobscot Bay, with its tip roughly east of downtown Rockland. The light station is located at the eastern tip of this peninsula. The light station was established in 1825 with the construction of a round, rubblestone tower by Jeremiah Berry and Green & Foster. The tower was rebuilt in 1852. It is a  cylindrical brick tower on a granite foundation standing on top a cliff. It has one of the last six Fresnel lenses in operation in Maine.

In 1854, a keeper's house was built separate from the lighthouse. The cottage now serves as the headquarters of the American Lighthouse Foundation. A fourth order Fresnel lens was installed in 1856. A generator house and an oil storage building were added in 1895.

Renovations carried out in 2010 saw the tower restored to its 1852 appearance. In addition to repainting the tower, repairs were done to the bricks, the lantern's ironwork and windowpanes, and the parapet's floor.

Gallery

See also
National Register of Historic Places listings in Knox County, Maine

References

External links

Owls Head State Park Department of Agriculture, Conservation and Forestry

Lighthouses completed in 1826
Lighthouses on the National Register of Historic Places in Maine
Lighthouses in Knox County, Maine
1826 establishments in Maine
National Register of Historic Places in Knox County, Maine
State parks of Maine